Dmytro Dmytrovich Semochko (born 25 January 1979) is a Ukrainian former professional footballer who played as a defender. He played in the Ukrainian Premier League with Karpaty Lviv, Dnipro Dnipropetrovsk and Metalist Kharkiv and in the Russian Premier League with Uralan Elista, FC Luch Vladivostok and Shinnik Yaroslavl.

Career
Semochko began his football career in Ukraine, playing as a striker for FC Lviv and Karpaty Lviv. In 2000, he moved abroad joining Russian Premier League side Uralan Elista, where he was expected to be a top performer. However, the club finished bottom of the league, suffering a 9–0 defeat to Lokomotiv Moscow during the process. Semochko stayed with Uralan as the club secured an immediate return to the Russian Premier League. He scored the first Russian Premier League goal at the Lokomotiv Stadium, an own goal in FC Elista's 1–0 loss to FC Lokomotiv Moscow on 5 July 2002.

References

External links
  Player page on the official FC Shinnik Yaroslavl website
 

1979 births
Living people
People from Lviv Oblast
Ukrainian footballers
Association football defenders
FC Lviv (1992) players
FC Karpaty Lviv players
FC Elista players
FC Dnipro players
FC Luch Vladivostok players
FC Shinnik Yaroslavl players
FC Rostov players
FC Hoverla Uzhhorod players
FC Khimki players
Russian Premier League players
Ukrainian Premier League players
FC Nizhny Novgorod (2007) players
Ukrainian expatriate footballers
Ukrainian expatriate sportspeople in Russia
Expatriate footballers in Russia